Empodium is a genus of flowering plants in the family Hypoxidaceae, first described in 1866. The genus is native to winter-rainfall areas in South Africa, Eswatini, Lesotho, and Namibia.

Species
 Empodium elongatum (Nel) B.L.Burtt - Lesotho, Eswatini, Lesotho
 Empodium flexile (Nel) M.F.Thomps. ex Snijman - Cape Province
 Empodium gloriosum (Nel) B.L.Burtt - Cape Province
 Empodium monophyllum (Nel) B.L.Burtt - KwaZulu-Natal, Eswatini
 Empodium namaquensis (Baker) M.F.Thomps. - Cape Province
 Empodium plicatum (Thunb.) Garside - Cape Province
 Empodium veratrifolium (Willd.) M.F.Thomps. - Cape Province

References

External links
Wisley Alpine Log

Asparagales genera
Flora of Southern Africa